David Marando is an Australian rugby league footballer who represented the United States in the 2013 Rugby League World Cup.

Playing career
He currently plays for the Belrose Eagles. In 2013 & 2017, Marando was named in the United States squad for both the 2013 & 2017 World Cup.

References

External links
2017 RLWC profile

1984 births
Living people
Australian rugby league players
Australian people of American descent
Rugby league halfbacks
United States national rugby league team players